The South Bound Brook School District is a community public school district that serves public school students in pre-kindergarten through eighth grade from South Bound Brook, in Somerset County, New Jersey, United States.

As of the 2020–21 school year, the district, comprised of one school, had an enrollment of 425 students and 37.0 classroom teachers (on an FTE basis), for a student–teacher ratio of 11.5:1.

The district is classified by the New Jersey Department of Education as being in District Factor Group "B", the second lowest of eight groupings. District Factor Groups organize districts statewide to allow comparison by common socioeconomic characteristics of the local districts. From lowest socioeconomic status to highest, the categories are A, B, CD, DE, FG, GH, I and J.

For ninth through twelfth grades, public school students attend Bound Brook High School in Bound Brook as part of a sending/receiving relationship with the Bound Brook School District. As of the 2020–21 school year, the high school had an enrollment of 652 students and 48.5 classroom teachers (on an FTE basis), for a student–teacher ratio of 13.4:1.

Schools
Robert Morris School had an enrollment of 428 students in grades PreK-8 as of the 2020–21 school year.

Administration
Core members of the district's administration are:
Dr. Lorise Goeke, Superintendent / Principal
Sally Dolan, Business Administrator / Board Secretary

Board of education
The district's board of education, comprised of seven members, sets policy and oversees the fiscal and educational operation of the district through its administration. As a Type II school district, the board's trustees are elected directly by voters to serve three-year terms of office on a staggered basis, with either two or three seats up for election each year held (since 2012) as part of the November general election. The board appoints a superintendent to oversee the district's day-to-day operations and a business administrator to supervise the business functions of the district.

References

External links
South Bound Brook School District: Robert Morris School

School Data for the South Bound Brook School District, National Center for Education Statistics
Bound Brook High School Alumni Association and Hall of Fame 

South Bound Brook, New Jersey
New Jersey District Factor Group B
School districts in Somerset County, New Jersey
Public K–8 schools in New Jersey